The politics of New Zealand function within a framework of a unitary parliamentary representative democracy. The structure of government is based on the Westminster system, and the legal system is modelled on the common law of England. New Zealand is a constitutional monarchy, in which King Charles III is the sovereign and head of state.

The New Zealand Parliament holds legislative power and consists of the King and the House of Representatives. The King is represented by the governor-general when not present in the country himself. Members of Parliament (MPs) are elected to the House of Representatives usually every three years. MPs usually belong to political parties. New Zealand has a multi-party system, though the dominant parties have historically been the Labour Party and the National Party (or its predecessors). Minority governments are common and typically dependent on confidence-and-supply agreements with other parties in the House of Representatives.

Executive power in New Zealand is based on the principle that while the King reigns, the Government rules. Although an integral part of the process of government, the King and his governor-general remain politically neutral and are not personally involved in the everyday aspects of governing. The New Zealand Government exercises authority on behalf of and by the consent of the sovereign. Government is made up of ministers, who are selected from among MPs and accountable to Parliament. Most ministers are members of the Cabinet, which is the main decision-making body of the Government. The prime minister is the most senior minister, chair of the Cabinet, and thus head of government. Other ministers are appointed by the governor-general upon the advice of the prime minister.

The Economist Intelligence Unit rated New Zealand as the second most democratic country in the 2021 Democracy Index. The country ranks highly for government transparency and has the lowest perceived level of corruption in the world.

Legal framework 

New Zealand is a unitary parliamentary democracy under a constitutional monarchy. It has no formal codified constitution; the constitutional framework consists of a mixture of various documents (including certain acts of the United Kingdom and New Zealand Parliaments), the principles of the Treaty of Waitangi and constitutional conventions. The Constitution Act in 1852 established the system of government and these were later consolidated in 1986. Constitutional rights are protected under common law and are strengthened by the Bill of Rights Act 1990 and Human Rights Act 1993, although these are not entrenched and can be overturned by Parliament with a simple majority. The Constitution Act 1986 describes the three branches of government in New Zealand: the executive (the Sovereign and the Executive Council), the legislature (Parliament) and the judiciary (Courts).

Legislature 

|King
|colspan=2|Charles III
|8 September 2022
|-
|Governor-General
|colspan=2|Dame Cindy Kiro
|21 October 2021
|-
|Speaker of the House
|Adrian Rurawhe
|Labour
|24 August 2022
|-
|Leader of the House
|Grant Robertson
|Labour
|25 January 2023
|-
|}

Parliament is responsible for passing laws, adopting the annual Budget, and exercising control of the executive government. It currently has a single chamber, the House of Representatives. Before 1951 there was a second chamber, the Legislative Council. The House of Representatives meets in Parliament House, Wellington.

Laws are first proposed to the House of Representatives as bills. They have to go through a process of approval by the House and governor-general before becoming acts of Parliament (i.e. statutory law).

The lawmakers are called members of Parliament, or MPs. Parliament is elected for a maximum term of three years, although an election may be called earlier in exceptional circumstances. As in many other parliamentary systems of government, the executive (called "the Government") is drawn from and is answerable to Parliament—for example, a successful motion of no confidence will force a government either to resign or to seek a parliamentary dissolution and an early general election.

Elections

Under FPP the candidate in a given electorate (district) that received the most votes was elected to the House of Representatives. The elections since 1935 have been dominated by two political parties, National and Labour.

As a result, New Zealand has used the mixed-member proportional (MMP) system since 1996. Under MMP, each member of Parliament is either directly elected by voters in a single-member district via FPP or appointed from their party's list. Parliament currently has 120 seats, though some past elections have resulted in overhang. By rarely producing an overall majority for one party, MMP ensures that parties need to come to an agreement with other parties to pass laws.

Seven electorates are reserved for MPs elected on a separate Māori roll. However, Māori may choose to vote in and to run for the non-reserved electorates and for the party list (since 1996), and as a result many have now entered Parliament outside of the reserved seats.

Party politics 

The first political party in New Zealand was founded in 1891, and its main rival was founded in 1909—New Zealand had a de facto two-party system from that point until the adoption of MMP in 1996. Since then New Zealand has been a multi-party system, with at least five parties elected in every election since. No party was able to govern without support from other groups from 1996 until 2020, making coalition government standard.

Historically the two largest, and oldest, parties are the New Zealand Labour Party (formed in 1916) and the New Zealand National Party (formed in 1936). Labour has generally positioned itself as centre-left in New Zealand politics, and has featured socialist (historically) and social-democratic principles in its platform and legislation, while National has generally positioned itself as centre-right, and has liberal and conservative tendencies.

Parties must register with the Electoral Commission in order to contest the party vote in an election.

The table below summarises the results of the latest general election and the numbers of seats won by parties represented in Parliament.

Executive government

King Charles III is New Zealand's sovereign and head of state. The New Zealand monarchy has been distinct from the British monarchy following the Statute of Westminster Adoption Act 1947, and all Charles III's official business in New Zealand is conducted in the name of the "King of New Zealand". The King's role is largely ceremonial, and his residual powers—called collectively the "royal prerogative"—are mostly exercised through the government of the day. These include the power to enact legislation, to sign treaties and to declare war.

Since the King is not usually resident in New Zealand, the functions of the monarchy are delegated to his representative, the governor-general. , the incumbent Governor-General is Dame Cindy Kiro. A governor-general formally has the power to appoint and dismiss ministers and to dissolve Parliament; and the power to reject or sign bills into law by royal assent after passage by the House of Representatives. The governor-general chairs the Executive Council, which is a formal committee consisting of all ministers, who advise the governor-general on the exercising of the prerogative powers. Members of the Executive Council are required to be members of Parliament (MPs), and most are also in the Cabinet.

Cabinet is the senior decision-making body in Government, led by the prime minister (currently Chris Hipkins), who is also, by convention, the parliamentary leader of the largest governing party. The prime minister, being the de facto leader of New Zealand, exercises executive functions that are formally vested in the sovereign (by way of the prerogative powers). Ministers within Cabinet make major decisions collectively, and are therefore collectively responsible for the consequences of these decisions.

Following a general election, a government is formed by the party or coalition that can command the confidence (support) of a majority of MPs in the House of Representatives. In this way, parties in government are said to have a "mandate" from voters and authority to implement manifestos (although this view has been criticised as being simplistic when applied to coalition arrangements). Since 2020, the Labour Party alone holds a majority of seats in the House—unprecedented under New Zealand's MMP system—and forms the Sixth Labour Government, a majority government.

, the National Party has formed the Official Opposition to the Labour-led Government. The leader of the Opposition heads a Shadow Cabinet, which scrutinises the actions of the Cabinet led by the prime minister. The Opposition within Parliament helps to hold the Government to account by means of parliamentary questions, non-government bills, and the possibility of no-confidence motions.

Judiciary

The New Zealand judiciary has four basic levels of courts:
The Supreme Court;
the Court of Appeal;
the High Court;
and the District Court (including the Youth Court).

The Supreme Court was established in 2004, under the Supreme Court Act 2003, and replaced the Privy Council in London as New Zealand's court of last resort. The High Court deals with serious criminal offences and civil matters, and hears appeals from subordinate courts. The Court of Appeal hears appeals from the High Court on points of law.

The chief justice, the head of the judiciary, presides over the Supreme Court, and is appointed by the governor-general on the advice of the prime minister.  the incumbent Chief Justice is Dame Helen Winkelmann. All other superior court judges are appointed on the advice of the chief justice, the attorney-general, and the solicitor-general. Judges and judicial officers are appointed non-politically and under strict rules regarding tenure to help maintain judicial independence from the executive government. Judges are appointed according to their qualifications, personal qualities, and relevant experience. A judge may not be removed from office except by the attorney-general upon an address of the House of Representatives for proved misbehaviour.

New Zealand law has three principal sources: English common law, certain statutes of the United Kingdom Parliament enacted before 1947 (notably the Bill of Rights 1689), and statutes of the New Zealand Parliament. In interpreting common law, the courts have endeavoured to preserve uniformity with common law as interpreted in the United Kingdom and related jurisdictions.

Local government

New Zealand is a unitary state rather than a federation—local government has only the powers conferred upon it by the national Parliament. These powers have traditionally been distinctly fewer than in some other countries; for example, police and education are run by central government. Local government is established by statute, with the first Municipal Corporations Act having been passed by the Legislative Council in 1842. Local governance is currently defined by the Local Government Act 2002.

Local elections are held every three years to elect regional, city and district councillors (including mayors); community board members; and district health board members.

Foreign relations

New Zealand maintains a network of 29 embassies and 99 consulates abroad and holds relations with about 150 countries. New Zealand is involved in the Pacific Islands Forum, the Pacific Community, Asia-Pacific Economic Cooperation, the East Asia Summit, and the ASEAN Regional Forum. It is a member of the Commonwealth of Nations, Organisation for Economic Co-operation and Development (OECD), and a founding member of the United Nations (UN). New Zealand is party to a number of free-trade agreements, most prominently Closer Economic Relations with Australia and the New Zealand–China Free Trade Agreement.

Historically New Zealand aligned itself strongly with the United Kingdom and had few bilateral relations with other countries. In the later 20th century, relationships in the Asia-Pacific region became more important. New Zealand has also traditionally worked closely with Australia, whose foreign policy followed a similar historical trend. In turn, many Pacific Islands (such as Samoa) have looked to New Zealand's lead. A large proportion of New Zealand's foreign aid goes to these countries and many Pacific people migrate to New Zealand for employment. Despite the 1986 rupture in the ANZUS military alliance (as a result of New Zealand's nuclear-free policy), New Zealand has maintained good working relations with the United States and Australia on a broad array of international issues.

Political culture

Political change in New Zealand has been gradual and pragmatic, rather than revolutionary. The nation's approach to governance has emphasised social welfare, and multiculturalism, which is based on immigration, social integration, and suppression of far-right politics, that has wide public and political support. New Zealand is regarded as one of the most honest countries in the world, and it was ranked first in the world in 2017 for lowest perceived level of corruption by the organisation Transparency International. Democracy and rule of law are founding political principles in New Zealand. Early Pākehā settlers believed that traditional British legal principles (including individual title to land) would be upheld in New Zealand. The nation's history, such as the legacy of the British colonial rule evidenced in the Westminster system, continues to have an impact on political culture, despite New Zealand's political independence. , New Zealand is identified as a "full democracy" in the Economist Intelligence Unit's Democracy Index. The country rates highly for civic participation in the political process, with 82% voter turnout during recent elections, compared with the  average of 69%.

Since the 1970s, New Zealand has shown a more socially liberal outlook. Beginning with the decriminalisation of homosexuality in 1986, successive governments have progressively increased the protection of LGBT rights, culminating in the legalisation of same-sex marriage in 2013. In 2020, the Abortion Legislation Act, that fully decriminalised abortion in New Zealand, was supported by members across all parties in Parliament.

The idea of serving as a moral example to the world has been an important element of New Zealand national identity. The anti-apartheid movement in the 1970s and 1980s, protests against French nuclear testing at Moruroa atoll in the 1970s, and popular support for New Zealand's anti-nuclear policy in the 1980s  are manifestations of this. From the 1990s New Zealand's anti-nuclear position has become a key element of government policy (irrespective of party) and of the country's "distinctive political identity".

History

Prior to New Zealand becoming a British colony in 1840, politics in New Zealand was dominated by Māori chiefs as leaders of hapu and iwi, utilising Māori customs as a political system (see ).

Colonial politics

After the 1840 Treaty of Waitangi, a colonial governor and his small staff acted on behalf of the British Government based on the British political system. Whereas Māori systems had dominated prior to 1840, governors attempting to introduce British systems met with mixed success in Māori communities. More isolated Māori were little influenced by the Government. Most influences were felt in and around Russell, the first capital, and Auckland, the second capital.

The first voting rights in New Zealand were legislated in 1852 as the New Zealand Constitution Act for the 1853 elections and reflected contemporary British practice. The electoral franchise was limited to property-owning male British subjects over 21 years old. The property qualification was relatively liberal in New Zealand compared to Britain, such that by the late 1850s 75% of adult New Zealand European males were eligible to vote, compared to 20% in England and 12% in Scotland. Around 100 Māori chiefs voted in the 1853 election.

During the 1850s provincial-based government was the norm. Provincial councils were abolished in 1876. Politics was initially dominated by conservative and wealthy "wool lords" who owned multiple sheep farms, mainly in Canterbury. During the gold rush era starting 1858 suffrage was extended to all British gold miners who owned a 1-pound mining license. The conservatives had been influenced by the militant action of gold miners in Victoria at Eureka. Many gold miners had moved to the New Zealand fields bringing their radical ideas. The extended franchise was modelled on the Victorian system. In 1863 the mining franchise was extended to goldfield business owners. By 1873 of the 41,500 registered voters 47% were gold field miners or owners.

After the brief Land War period ending in 1864, Parliament moved to extend the franchise to more Māori. Donald McLean introduced a bill for four temporary Māori electorates and extended the franchise to all Māori men over 21 in 1867. As such, Māori were universally franchised 12 years prior to European men.

In 1879 an economic depression hit, resulting in poverty and many people, especially miners, returning to Australia. Between 1879 and 1881 Government was concerned at the activities of Māori activists based on confiscated land at Parihaka. Activists destroyed settlers' farm fences and ploughed up roads and land, which incensed local farmers. Arrests followed but the activities persisted. Fears grew among settlers that the resistance campaign was a prelude to armed conflict. The Government itself was puzzled as to why the land had been confiscated and offered a huge 25,000-acre reserve to the activists, provided they stopped the destruction. Commissioners set up to investigate the issue said that the activities "could fairly be called hostile". A power struggle ensued resulting in the arrest of all the prominent leaders by a large government force in 1881. Historian Hazel Riseborough describes the event as a conflict over who had authority or mana—the Government or the Parihaka protestors.

In 1882 the export of meat in the first refrigerated ship started a period of sustained economic export-led growth. This period is notable for the influence of new social ideas and movements such as the Fabians and the creation in 1890 of the first political party, the Liberals. Their leader, former gold miner Richard Seddon from Lancashire, was premier from 1893 to 1906. The Liberals introduced new taxes to break the influence of the wealthy conservative sheep farm owners. They also purchased more land from Māori. (By 1910, Māori in parts of the North Island retained very little land, and the amount of Māori land would decrease precipitously as a result of government purchases.)

The early 20th century saw the rise of the trade union movement and labour parties , which represented organised workers. The West Coast town of Blackball is often regarded as the birthplace of the labour movement in New Zealand, as it was the location of the founding of one of the main political organisations which became part of the New Zealand Labour Party.

Māori politics and legislation 

Māori political affairs have been developing through legislation such as the Resource Management Act 1991 and the Te Ture Whenua Māori Act 1993 and many more. Since colonisation in the 1800s, Māori have had their customary laws oppressed, with the imposition of a Westminster democracy and political style. As reparations from the colonial war and general discrepancies during colonisation, the New Zealand Government has formally apologised to those iwi affected, through settlements and legislation. In the 1960s Māori Politics Relations began to exhibit more positivity. The legislature enacted a law to help Māori retrieve back their land, not hinder them, through the Māori Affairs Amendment Act 1967. Since then, this progressive change in attitude has materialised as legislation to protect the natural environment or Taonga, and the courts by establishing treaty principles that always have to be considered when deciding laws in the courts. Moreover, the Māori Lands Act 2016 was printed both in Te Reo Māori and English—the act itself affirms the equal legal status of Te Reo Māori.

Women in politics 

Women's suffrage was granted after about two decades of campaigning by women such as Kate Sheppard and Mary Ann Müller and organisations such as the New Zealand branch of the Women's Christian Temperance Union. On 19 September 1893 the governor, Lord Glasgow, signed a new Electoral Act into law. As a result, New Zealand became the first self-governing nation in the world in which all women had the right to vote in parliamentary elections. Women first voted in the 1893 election, with a high 85% turnout (compared to 70% of men).

Women were not eligible to be elected to the House of Representatives until 1919 though, when three women, including Ellen Melville stood. The first woman to win an election (to the seat held by her late husband) was Elizabeth McCombs in 1933. Mabel Howard became the first female cabinet minister in 1947, being appointed to the First Labour Government.

New Zealand was the first country in the world in which all the highest offices were occupied by women, between March 2005 and August 2006: the Sovereign Queen Elizabeth II, Governor-General Dame Silvia Cartwright, Prime Minister Helen Clark, Speaker of the House Margaret Wilson, and Chief Justice Dame Sian Elias.

Modern political history

The right-leaning National Party and the left-leaning Labour Party have dominated New Zealand political life since a Labour government came to power in 1935. During fourteen years in office (1935–1949), the Labour Party implemented a broad array of social and economic legislation, including comprehensive social security, a large scale public works programme, a forty-hour working week, and compulsory unionism. The National Party won control of the government in 1949, accepting most of Labour's welfare measures. Except for two brief periods of Labour governments in 1957–1960 and 1972–1975, National held power until 1984.

The greatest challenge to the first and later Labour governments' policies on the welfare state and a regulated economy that combined state and private enterprise came from the Labour Party itself. After regaining control in 1984, the fourth Labour government instituted a series of radical market-oriented reforms. It privatised state assets and reduced the role of the state in the economy. It also instituted a number of other more left-wing reforms, such as allowing the Waitangi Tribunal to hear claims of breaches of the Treaty of Waitangi to be made back to 1840. In 1987, the government introduced the New Zealand Nuclear Free Zone, Disarmament, and Arms Control Act, banning visits by nuclear powered ships; the implementation of a nuclear-free zone brought about New Zealand's suspension from the ANZUS security alliance with the United States and Australia.

In October 1990, the National Party again formed a government, for the first of three three-year terms. Despite promises to halt the unpopular reform process, the new National government largely advanced the free-market policies of the preceding government. Public disillusionment resulting from perceived "broken promises" of the previous two governments fuelled demand for electoral reform in New Zealand. In 1996, New Zealand inaugurated the new electoral system (mixed-member proportional representation, or MMP) to elect its Parliament. The MMP system was expected (among numerous other goals) to increase representation of smaller parties in Parliament and appears to have done so in the MMP elections to date. Between 1996 and 2020, neither National nor Labour had an absolute majority in Parliament, and for all but two of those years a minority government ruled (however, every government has been led by one or other of the two main parties).

MMP parliaments have been markedly more diverse, with greater representation of women, and ethnic minorities and other minority groups. In 1996, Tim Barnett was the first of several New Zealand MPs to be elected as an openly gay person. In 1999, Georgina Beyer became the world's first openly transgender MP elected to a national parliament.

After nine years in government, the National Party lost the November 1999 election. Labour under Helen Clark out-polled National and formed a coalition government with Jim Anderton's Alliance, a party to the left of Labour. The coalition partners pioneered "agree to disagree" procedures to manage policy differences. The minority government often relied on support from the Green Party to pass legislation. Labour retained power in the 27 July 2002 election, forming a coalition with Anderton's new Progressive Party, and reaching an agreement for support with the United Future party. Helen Clark remained Prime Minister. In early 2004, Labour came under attack for its policies on the ownership of the foreshore and seabed, eventually culminating in the establishment of a new break-away party, the Māori Party. Following the 2005 general election on 17 September 2005, negotiations between parties culminated in Helen Clark announcing a third consecutive term of Labour-led government. The Labour Party again formed a coalition with the Progressive Party, with confidence and supply from Winston Peters' New Zealand First and Peter Dunne's United Future.

After the general election in November 2008, the National Party moved quickly to form a minority government with ACT, the Māori Party and United Future. This arrangement allowed National to decrease its reliance on the right-wing ACT party, whose free-market policies are sometimes controversial with the greater New Zealand public. In 2008, John Key was appointed Prime Minister, with Bill English his deputy. This arrangement conformed to a tradition of having a north–south split in the major parties' leadership, as Key's residence is in Auckland and English's electorate is in the South Island. On 12 December 2016, English was elected as leader, and thus Prime Minister, by the National Party caucus after Key's unexpected resignation a week earlier. Paula Bennett (member for Upper Harbour) was appointed Deputy Prime Minister, thus continuing the tradition. This north–south arrangement ceased with the next government.

Following the 2017 general election National retained its plurality in the House of Representatives, while Labour greatly increased its proportion of the vote and number of seats. Following negotiations between the major and minor parties, Labour formed a minority government after securing a coalition arrangement with New Zealand First. The new government also agreed a confidence-and-supply arrangement with the Green Party. On 26 October 2017, Labour leader Jacinda Ardern was sworn in as Prime Minister and Winston Peters became her deputy. In the 2020 general election Labour won by a landslide and gained an overall majority of seats in Parliament, sufficient to govern alone—a first under the MMP system. Labour's coalition partner New Zealand First lost its representation in Parliament. Ardern's government was sworn in for a second term on 6 November 2020. The Labour government is currently led by Prime Minister Chris Hipkins, who assumed office on 25 January 2023 following the resignation of Jacinda Ardern.

See also

 The Crown
 List of political parties in New Zealand
 List of New Zealand politicians
 List of political scandals in New Zealand
 List of public sector organisations in New Zealand
 Political funding in New Zealand
 Christian politics in New Zealand
 Contents of the United States diplomatic cables leak (New Zealand)

References

Citations

Sources

Further reading

External links 
Politics and Government at NZ History Online
Institutions of Government at Te Ara: The Encyclopedia of New Zealand